Viktor Yevhenovych Leonenko (born 5 October 1969) is a former footballer and Ukraine international who played as a forward. At least since 2006 he is a football commentator and analyst for the televised football forum "3 time" at the Ukrainian TV-network ICTV.

Club career
Leonenko began his career with stints at Russian clubs such as Geolog Tyumen and FC Dynamo Moscow, before transferring to FC Dynamo Kyiv in 1992, where he played until 1998.

A successful forward for Dynamo in the early to mid 1990s – Leonenko was named Ukrainian Footballer of the Year in 1992, 1993, and 1994 – Leonenko was eventually forced to the bench with the emergence of the striker partnership of Serhii Rebrov and Andriy Shevchenko. In 1998, he moved to play for CSKA Kyiv and ended his career with FC Zakarpattia Uzhhorod in 2001.

International career
Born in Russia, Leonenko chose to play for the Ukraine national team soon after transferring to Dynamo Kyiv. During his four years representing Ukraine from 1992 until 1996, Leonenko earned 14 caps and scored 6 goals.

Career statistics

Club

International
Scores and results list Ukraine's goal tally first, score column indicates score after each Leonenko goal.

References

External links
 
 
 List of all National team games
 
 Interview to the newspaper "Bulvar Gordona" 
  
 3 taim of 19 August 2010. The studio guest the Ukrainian coach Serhiy Rebrov (video footage) 
 Leonenko's football blog at segodnya.ua

1969 births
Living people
People from Tyumen
Association football forwards
Soviet footballers
Ukrainian footballers
Ukraine international footballers
FC Tyumen players
FC Dynamo Kyiv players
FC Dynamo-2 Kyiv players
FC Dynamo Moscow players
FC Hoverla Uzhhorod players
FC Arsenal Kyiv players
Soviet Top League players
Soviet First League players
Russian Premier League players
Ukrainian Premier League players
Russian emigrants to Ukraine
Naturalized citizens of Ukraine
Sportspeople from Tyumen Oblast